Xavier Vijay Kumar (born 25 November 1978) is Indian former footballer who is currently a football coach South United football club. Before being a coach at South United, he was a coach at Boca Juniors India. He most recently played for Students Union football club in the Banglaore Super Division. He spent 13 years playing for HAL following which he had a two-year stint with Churchill Brothers before joining Students Union.

References

External links
 Xavier Vijay Kumar profile at eurosport.com

1978 births
Living people
Footballers from Karnataka
I-League players
I-League 2nd Division players
Indian footballers
India international footballers
Churchill Brothers FC Goa players
Hindustan Aeronautics Limited S.C. players
Association football forwards